Gowdu may refer to:
 Gowdu, Bandar Abbas
 Gowdu, Minab